POU domain, class 2, transcription factor 3 is a protein that in humans is encoded by the POU2F3 gene.

References

Further reading 

POU-domain proteins